Proxhyle comoreana is a moth in the subfamily Arctiinae. It was described by Hervé de Toulgoët in 1959. It is found on Mayotte in the Indian Ocean off the coast of southeast Africa.

References

Moths described in 1959
Lithosiini